Parasite is an original novel written by Jim Mortimore and based on the long-running British science fiction television series Doctor Who. It features the Seventh Doctor, Ace and Bernice. A prelude to the novel, also penned by Mortimore, appeared in Doctor Who Magazine #220.

1994 British novels
1994 science fiction novels
Virgin New Adventures
Novels by Jim Mortimore
Seventh Doctor novels